Frane Čačić (born 25 June 1980, in Zagreb, Croatia, then Yugoslavia) is a Croatian retired footballer.

References

External links
 

1980 births
Living people
Footballers from Zagreb
Association football midfielders
Croatian footballers
Croatia under-21 international footballers
NK Zagreb players
HNK Hajduk Split players
NK Varaždin players
Busan IPark players
Lechia Gdańsk players
Changsha Ginde players
Croatian Football League players
K League 1 players
Ekstraklasa players
Chinese Super League players
Croatian expatriate footballers
Expatriate footballers in South Korea
Croatian expatriate sportspeople in South Korea
Expatriate footballers in Poland
Croatian expatriate sportspeople in Poland
Expatriate footballers in China
Croatian expatriate sportspeople in China